Miguel Ângelo Marques Granja  (born 17 December 1988), known as Bura, is a Portuguese professional footballer who plays as a central defender for União de Leiria.

He played 55 Primeira Liga matches for Paços de Ferreira, Beira-Mar and Penafiel, but spent most of his career in the second division where he made over 240 appearances with six teams, mainly Académico de Viseu.

Club career

Porto
Born in Matosinhos, Porto Metropolitan Area, Bura began his youth career with hometown clubs Leixões S.C. and F.C. Infesta before joining FC Porto at the age of 17. Never included for a matchday squad with the team, he had his first senior experience in the third division on loan to G.D. Ribeirão, and professional one with Portimonense SC, S.C. Covilhã, Gil Vicente F.C. and F.C. Penafiel all in Segunda Liga.

On 5 July 2010, Bura was loaned to Primeira Liga side F.C. Paços de Ferreira for the upcoming season. He made 15 total appearances for them, and was an unused substitute on 23 April as they lost the final of the Taça da Liga to S.L. Benfica at the Estádio Cidade de Coimbra.

Later career
Bura rescinded his Porto contract in August 2011, and signed for fellow top-flight team S.C. Beira-Mar. In July 2013, he joined G.D. Chaves who had just been promoted to division two and, a year later, was added to the ranks of F.C. Penafiel of the top tier.

In July 2015, after Penafiel's relegation as dead last, Bura moved to second-tier club Académico de Viseu F.C. on a three-year deal. He scored a career-best 12 goals in his second season there, including a brace in a 3–3 away draw against C.F. União on 12 November 2016 (through penalty kicks).

Bura returned to Leixões after 14 years away on 1 June 2018, on a two-year contract. He was signed by his former Académico manager Francisco Chaló, and had been close to joining a year earlier.

On 16 January 2023, Bura signed a year-and-a-half-long contract with União de Leiria.

International career
Bura earned 38 caps for Portugal from under-18 to under-23 level. He was part of the under-19 team at the 2007 UEFA European Championship in Austria, and scored in a 2–0 win over the hosts though other results eliminated the team from the group.

References

External links

1988 births
Living people
Sportspeople from Matosinhos
Portuguese footballers
Association football defenders
Primeira Liga players
Liga Portugal 2 players
Segunda Divisão players
FC Porto players
G.D. Ribeirão players
Portimonense S.C. players
S.C. Covilhã players
Gil Vicente F.C. players
F.C. Penafiel players
F.C. Paços de Ferreira players
S.C. Beira-Mar players
G.D. Chaves players
Académico de Viseu F.C. players
Leixões S.C. players
C.D. Mafra players
U.D. Leiria players
Portugal youth international footballers
Portugal under-21 international footballers